Nicole Maree Goodwin (born 14 September 1984) is a former Australian cricketer. A left-arm fast-medium bowler, she was capped at under-19 level for Australia. Domestically, she played 47 List A matches and 25 T20 matches during her professional career. Goodwin represented her home state of New South Wales between 2005/06 and 2010/11, winning the Women's National Cricket League on three occasions. She has also played for Nottinghamshire (2011), the Australian Capital Territory (2015/16–2017/18) and the Melbourne Renegades during the 2016–17 Women's Big Bash League season.

Born in Newcastle, New South Wales, Goodwin is a police officer outside of cricket.

References

External links
 
 

1984 births
Living people
Australian cricketers
Australian women cricketers
Australian police officers
ACT Meteors cricketers
Cricketers from Newcastle, New South Wales
Melbourne Renegades (WBBL) cricketers
New South Wales Breakers cricketers
Nottinghamshire women cricketers
Sportswomen from New South Wales
Australian expatriate sportspeople in England
Australian expatriate cricketers in the United Kingdom